Megan Duffy (born 1984) is an American basketball coach.

Megan Duffy may also refer to:

Megan Duffy (actress) (born 1979), American actress
Meghan Duffy, American biologist and ecologist
Meg Duffy, American guitarist